Adam J. Bogdanove (born 1964) is a Professor of Plant Pathology at Cornell University. He is most notable for his central role in the development of TAL effector based DNA targeting reagents, following his discovery of TAL effector modularity with Matthew Moscou in 2009. Since, he has been a leader in the field, pioneering applications in genome editing and contributing one of the most widely used methods for designing custom TAL effectors using Golden Gate Cloning. Bogdanove is now widely recognized for revolutionizing the area of DNA targeting, along with scientists such as Jennifer Doudna and Emmanuelle Charpentier.

Education
Bogdanove earned his Bachelor of Science degree in Biology from Yale University in 1987, and his Ph.D. in Plant Pathology from Cornell University in 1997, going on to do postdoctoral work at Purdue University.

Research and career
Bogdanove began his academic career in 2000 at Iowa State University as one of the first faculty hires of the Plant Science Institute. It was there that he made the 2006 landmark discovery of how TAL effectors recognize target sequences. A significant portion of his work uncovered the mechanisms by which TAL effectors increase disease susceptibility by manipulating host gene expression. Further work has paved the way for genome editing technologies like CRISPR and their applications, which use modified proteins to induce targeted changes in plant and animal DNA sequences. In 2012, Bogdanove returned to his alma mater as a Professor in the Plant Pathology and Plant- Microbe Biology section at Cornell University. Bogdanove's present research focuses on the pathogen Xanthomonas oryzae and its interactions with species of rice.

References

Selected bibliography

External links
 ResearcherID: ABE-6252-2020
 Google Scholar page: -nCwvkMAAAAJ
 ORCID: 0000-0003-1683-4117

1964 births
Living people
Cornell University College of Agriculture and Life Sciences alumni
Cornell University faculty
Place of birth missing (living people)
Yale College alumni